The 1922 San Francisco Seals season was the 20th season in the history of the San Francisco Seals baseball team. The 1922 team won the Pacific Coast League (PCL) pennant with a 128–72 record, the second best winning percentage in league history. The 1922 Seals also set a new PCL attendance record with 446,021 attending the club's home games.

The 1925 Seals were selected in 2003 by a panel of minor league experts as the eighth best team in the PCL's 100-year history. The team was also ranked No. 44 by Minor League Baseball in its ranking of the 100 greatest minor league teams in baseball history.

Dots Miller was hired as the club's manager in December 1921. Miller had been a major league infielder from 1909 to 1921 and was a member of the 1909 Pittsburgh Pirates team that defeated Ty Cobb's Detroit Tigers in the 1909 World Series.

Third baseman Willie Kamm, a San Francisco native, led the team with a .342 batting average, 20 home runs, 124 RBIs, and 137 runs scored. In May 1922, the Seals sold Kamm to the Chicago White Sox, effective at the start of the 1923 season, for $100,000 and two players. The $100,000 paid by the White Sox was the highest sum paid to that date for a minor league player. After his final game with the Seals, Kamm was honored in a ceremony at Recreation Park.

The pitching staff included three 20-game winners. Jim "Death Valley" Scott led the staff with 25 wins and a 2.22 earned run average (ERA). Ollie Mitchell won 24 games and Bob Geary 20.

Players

Batting 
Note: Pos = Position; G = Games played; AB = At bats; H = Hits; Avg. = Batting average; HR = Home runs; RBI = Runs batted in

Pitching 
Note: G = Games pitched; IP = Innings pitched; W = Wins; L = Losses; PCT = Win percentage; ERA = Earned run average; SO = Strikeouts

References

1922 in sports in California
Pacific Coast League seasons